Muellerella antarctica is a species of lichenicolous fungus in the family Verrucariaceae. It was discovered in 2008 on Isla Navarino in Chile where it parasitised Hypogymnia antarctica.

References

Verrucariales
Fungi described in 2008
Fungi of Chile
Lichenicolous fungi
Taxa named by Javier Angel Etayo Salazar